Vittorio Metz (18 July 1904 – 1 March 1984) was an Italian screenwriter and film director. He wrote for more than 110 films between 1939 and 1977.

Selected filmography

 Defendant, Stand Up! (1939)
 Lo vedi come sei... lo vedi come sei? (1939)
 The Pirate's Dream (1940)
 Non me lo dire! (1940)
 Annabella's Adventure (1943)
 The Za-Bum Circus (1944)
 Macario Against Zagomar (1944)
 Toto Tours Italy (1948)
 Eleven Men and a Ball (1948)
 Be Seeing You, Father (1948)
 Adam and Eve (1949)
 Toto Looks for a House (1949) 
 Figaro Here, Figaro There (1950)
 Totò Tarzan (1950)
 The Cadets of Gascony (1950)
 The Knight Has Arrived! (1950)
 Toto Looks for a Wife (1950)
 Toto the Sheik (1950)
 The Transporter (1950)
 Beauties on Bicycles (1951)
 Seven Hours of Trouble (1951)
 Toto the Third Man (1951)
 The Steamship Owner (1951)
 Free Escape (1951)
 I'm the Capataz (1951)
 The Reluctant Magician (1951)
 Arrivano i nostri (1951)
 Poppy (1952)
 If You Won a Hundred Million (1953)
 The Enchanting Enemy (1953)
 It Was She Who Wanted It! (1953)
 Red and Black  (1955)
 Totò, Eva e il pennello proibito (1959)
 Appuntamento a Ischia (1960)
 Hercules in the Valley of Woe (1961)
 Sua Eccellenza si fermò a mangiare (1961)
 Appuntamento in Riviera (1962)
 002 Operazione Luna (1965)
 The Most Beautiful Couple in the World (1968)

References

External links

1904 births
1984 deaths
20th-century Italian screenwriters
Italian male screenwriters
Italian film directors
20th-century Italian male writers